John Birmingham (born 1964) is an Australian author.

John Birmingham may also refer to:

 John Birmingham (fl. 1379), MP for Nottinghamshire
 John Birmingham (astronomer) (1816–1884), Irish astronomer
 John Birmingham (politician) (born 1953), Falkland Islands politician

See also
 John Bermingham (1923–2020), American politician